Adolfo Chávez Beyuma (born 2 March 1971), a Bolivian indigenous leader, has been the president of the Confederation of Indigenous Peoples of Bolivia (CIDOB) since 2006. Chávez is a member of the Takana people, born in Tumusa, Iturralde Province of the La Paz Department of Bolivia. He has twice been elected as Secretary of Land and Territory of the La Paz departmental indigenous organization, Center of Indigenous Peoples of La Paz (CPILAP).

He is one of the creators of the Flag of the Patujú flower which was a prominent symbol in the 2011 TIPNIS protests.

References

Bolivian politicians
Living people
1971 births
Confederation of Indigenous Peoples of Bolivia
Flag designers